Elias I or Eliya I may refer to:

 Elias I of Jerusalem, Patriarch in 494–516
 Elias I of Antioch, Syriac Orthodox Patriarch of Antioch in 709–723
 Elias I of Périgord (919–979)
 Patriarch Elias I of Alexandria, Greek Patriarch of Alexandria in 963–1000
 Elias I of Seleucia-Ctesiphon, Patriarch of the Church of the East in 1028-1049
 Elias I, Count of Maine (died in 1110)
 Elias Peter Hoayek, Maronite Patriarch in 1898–1931

See also
 Elias (disambiguation)
 Elijah (disambiguation)